The Music Victoria Awards of 2018 are the 13th Annual Music Victoria Awards and consist of a series of awards, presented on 21 November 2018, during Melbourne Music Week.

The Melbourne Recital Centre hosted the event for the first time, and, also for the first time, the Victorian Government provided $10,000 to the Best Victorian Album of 2018, and $5,000 to the Best Victorian Breakthrough Act of 2018.

On the 6 August 2018, a number of categories change were announced for the 2018 event.

The awards for Best Male and Female Act were renamed to Best Male and Female Musician accordingly.
The Best Solo Artist category was introduced to include gender non-conforming artists. Ten artists will be nominated, and Music Victoria's 40/40/20 gender diversity quotas will apply.
Best Emerging Act was renamed to Breakthrough Act.
The awards for Best Regional Venue and Best Regional Act were renamed to Best Regional/Outer Suburban Venue and Best Regional Act/Outer Suburban Act accordingly.
Best Festival award went from "general" category to "industry" voted.
Best Reggae or Dance Hall Act and Best Rock/Punk Album were introduced, allowing the Best Heavy Album category to more specifically celebrate metal and hard rock subgenres.
Best Indigenous/Aboriginal Act was renamed to The Archie Roach Foundation Award for Emerging Talent, and will now come with a cash grant and mentorship as part of the award.

Awards Executive Producer Patrick Donovan said "After each awards we survey the industry and judges to make sure the categories best reflect what is happening in Victoria in the year and the most deserved contributors to the industry are acknowledged. We are confident these changes to criteria and judging panels will result in awards that are more inclusive and better reflect outstanding achievements."

To be eligibility, at least 50% of the act has been living in Victoria for the last two years. The album, single or EP must have been released between 1 September 2017 and 31 August 2018.

Hall of Fame inductees
 Chrissy Amphlett, Molly Meldrum

Award nominees and winners

General awards
Voted on by the public.
Winners indicated in boldface, with other nominees in plain.

Genre Specific Awards
Voted by a select industry panel

Other Awards
Voted by a select industry panel

References

External links
 

2018 in Australian music
2018 music awards
Music Victoria Awards